Hello, I'm Johnny Cash is the 33rd album by American country singer Johnny Cash, released on Columbia Records in 1970 (see 1970 in music). "If I Were a Carpenter", a famous duet with Cash's wife, June Carter Cash, earned the couple a Grammy Award for Best Country Performance by a Duo or Group with Vocal in 1971 (see Grammy Awards of 1971); the song also reached #2 on the Country charts. This album also includes "To Beat the Devil", the first Kris Kristofferson song covered by Cash; the two would later collaborate numerous times, most famously on "Sunday Mornin' Comin' Down". "See Ruby Fall" and "Blistered" were also released as singles, and the album itself reached #1 on the country charts and No. 6 on the pop charts. It was certified Gold on January 29, 1970 the RIAA. The album has been released on CD (Sony Music, Original Album Classics, along with The Johnny Cash Show and Man In Black) and it has been made available on official download sites. This album is not to be confused with a 1977 Columbia Special Products compilation LP (issued on CD in 1992) with the same name.

Track listing

Personnel 
 Johnny Cash - vocals, guitar
 Carl Perkins, Bob Wootton, Jerry Shook, Fred Carter, Jr. - guitar
 Norman Blake - dobro, guitar
 Marshall Grant - bass guitar
 W.S. Holland - drums
 Bill Pursell - piano on "See Ruby Fall" and "If I Were a Carpenter"
 George Tidwell, Bob Phillips, William Pippin - trumpet
 The Carter Family - backing vocals
Technical
 Charlie Bragg - engineer
Joel Baldwin - cover photograph

Charts

Weekly charts

Year-end charts

Singles

Certifications

References

1970 albums
Albums produced by Bob Johnston
Columbia Records albums
Johnny Cash albums